Diana Christine Merriweather Ashby (March 22, 1963 – May 2, 1997) was an American cancer activist and founder of the Melanoma Research Foundation. Diana Ashby died on May 2, 1997. She was married to NASA Astronaut Jeffrey S. Ashby (Captain, USN, Ret.), sister of American painter Allison Lee Merriweather, and great granddaughter of American Painter, Florence Cornish  (1899–1983).

References

External links 
Diana Ashby Memorial Page

1963 births
1997 deaths
Activists from California
Deaths from melanoma
Deaths from cancer in the United States